"Now You're Gone" is a song by the English hard rock band Whitesnake from their 1989 album Slip of the Tongue. It was written by singer David Coverdale and guitarist Adrian Vandenberg. The power ballad follows an alternately slow/fast-paced rhythm, and the lyrics tell about longing for the woman after a break-up.

"Now You're Gone" was released as the third and final single from Slip of the Tongue, remixed by Chris Lord-Alge. While it was a Top 40 chart success in the UK, it barely made it onto Billboard Hot 100 in the US.

Music video
A music video was shot in 1990 in the afternoon before and during a live show in Philadelphia to promote the single. The video was directed by Wayne Isham and features the band playing the song on stage, with footage of the fans interspersed with shots from the concert. In the booklet of the 20th anniversary edition of Slip of the Tongue, David Coverdale commented:

"I remember shooting the video with Wayne Isham in front of a sold out crowd at the Spectrum in Philadelphia, unfortunately it received minimal airplay as MTV was changing its format... still, I think it's one of the best videos we've done..."

Track listing
All tracks written by David Coverdale and Adrian Vandenberg.

7"/Cassette Single
A. "Now You're Gone" (Remix) – 4:12
B. "Wings of the Storm" (L.P. Version) – 5:00

12" Single
A. "Now You're Gone" (Remix) – 4:12
B1. "Kittens Got Claws" (L.P. Version) – 5:01
B1. "Cheap an' Nasty" (L.P. Version) – 3:29

CD Single
 "Now You're Gone" (Remix) – 4:15
 "Wings of the Storm" (L.P. Version) – 5:03
 "Kittens Got Claws" (L.P. Version) – 5:02
 "Cheap an' Nasty" (L.P. Version) – 3:29

Personnel
David Coverdale – lead vocals
Steve Vai – guitars
Adrian Vandenberg – guitars (credited, but does not actually appear)
Rudy Sarzo – bass guitar
Tommy Aldridge – drums

Charts

References

1980s ballads
Whitesnake songs
1989 songs
1990 singles
EMI Records singles
Hard rock ballads
Music videos directed by Wayne Isham
Song recordings produced by Keith Olsen
Songs written by Adrian Vandenberg
Songs written by David Coverdale